The 1998 Barnet Council election took place on 7 May 1998 to elect members of Barnet London Borough Council in London, England. The whole council was up for election and the council stayed under no overall control.

Following the elections, the Labour-Liberal Democrat coalition that had governed since 1994 continued in office.

Background

Election result
Overall turnout in the election was 35.9%.

|}

Ward results

Arkley

Brunswick Park

Burnt Oak

Childs Hill

Colindale

East Barnet

East Finchley

Edgware

Finchley

Friern Barnet

Garden Suburb

Golders Green

Hadley

Hale

Hendon

Mill Hill

St Paul's

Totteridge

West Hendon

Woodhouse

By-elections between 1998 and 2002

Woodhouse

The by-election was called following the resignation of Cllr. Stanley J. Cross.

Garden Suburb

The by-election was called following the resignation of Cllr. Peter J. Skolar.

Hadley

The by-election was called following the resignation of Cllr. Hazel E. Mammatt.

Mill Hill

The by-election was called following the resignation of Cllr. Roger L. Axworthy.

Finchley

The by-election was called following the death of Cllr. Barbara I. Langstone.

References

1998
1998 London Borough council elections